The Bank of Bahrain and Kuwait (BBK) was established on 16 March 1971 in both the Kingdom of Bahrain and the State of Kuwait. Its shareholders consist of the general public, the government of Bahrain, banks and investment companies in Kuwait. BBK engages in the provision of various services and banking products throughout its branches in Bahrain, Kuwait and India as well as its representative office in Dubai, United Arab Emirates.

Operations
The BBK is split into four major segments: Retail Banking deals with individual customers through e-banking, loans, multi-feature accounts, credit facilities etc.; Treasury and Investment which handles internal consults with the various departments and affiliated companies to handle capital management; Corporate Banking focuses on corporate and institutional customers within Bahrain; and International Banking works with overseas corporates and institutional customers, with branches in India, representative offices in Turkey and Dubai, and global correspondence with larger banks, to manage overseas trading, money marketing plus funding operations.

Shareholders
 Ithmaar Bank B.S.C 25.38%
 Pension Fund Commission 18.77%
 Kuwait Investment Authority 18.70%
 Social Insurance Organisation 13.34%

Subsidiaries 
Subsidiaries of the BBK include: CrediMax which specialises in credit card issuing; Capinnova Investment Bank, a Sharia compliant investment banking division of the BBK which works with the corporate finance and private equity departments; Invita is a call centre outsourcing subsidiary; Sakana, a joint venture between Capinnova and Ithmaar Bank, focusing on Islamic finance in the real estate sector; Global Payment Services (GPS), a branch of Credimax that specialises in processing and outsourcing business to local and overseas clients.

References

External links
 Home page

Bahraini companies established in 1971
Kuwaiti companies established in 1971
Banks established in 1971
Banks of Bahrain
Banks of Kuwait
Companies listed on the Bahrain Bourse